Rosenlewin Urheilijat-38, RU-38 for short, was a sports club based in Pori, Finland. It was founded in 1938 by the W. Rosenlew Company. The club was best known by its football and ice hockey sections. In 1967 RU-38 merged with another local club, Karhut, forming a new club named Ässät.

The athletes of RU-38 were usually semi-professionals. They had a job at the company's factories and could use their working hours in training.

Football

In the 1950s RU-38 recruited several Finnish national team players, such as Aimo Sommarberg and Stig-Göran Myntti and was promoted to the national top league in 1958. The next season club finished 2nd in Mestaruussarja. 1960 RU-38 played in the Finnish Cup final by losing 1–3 for FC Haka.

After RU-38 was merged with Karhut, Ässät inherited RU-38's football section.

Season to season

2 seasons in Mestaruussarja
16 seasons in Suomensarja
5 seasons in Maakuntasarja

Ice hockey

RU-38 was promoted to the top hockey league SM-sarja in 1964. Club won the Finnish championship in 1967. RU-38 also made a short appearance in British espionage film Billion Dollar Brain that was partly shot in Finland. They performed a hockey fight with another Finnish team Karhu-Kissat.

Other sports
The most notable other athletes representing RU-38 were 1500-metre world record holder Olavi Salonen and 1960 Olympics pole vault bronze medalist Eeles Landström.

The club also had bandy on its programme.

Honors
Football:
Finnish championship: runners-up 1959
Finnish Cup: runners-up 1960
Football Association of Finland Satakunta district champions: 1950, 1951, 1953, 1954, 1956, 1957, 1959, 1960, 1961, 1962, 1963, 1966, 1967
Ice hockey
Finnish champions: 1967
Finnish Cup winners: 1965

See also 
Porin Karhut
Porin Ässät
Porin Ässät football

External links
RU-38 football history (in Finnish)

References

Football clubs in Finland
Association football clubs established in 1938
Bandy clubs established in 1938
Association football clubs disestablished in 1967
1938 establishments in Finland
1967 disestablishments in Finland
Defunct bandy clubs in Finland
Ässät